The 2010 BBC Sports Personality of the Year Award, held on 19 December, was the 57th presentation of the BBC Sports Personality of the Year Awards. Awarded annually by the BBC, the main titular award honours an individual's British sporting achievement over the past year. The winner is selected by public vote from a 10-person shortlist. Other awards presented include team, coach, and young personality of the year.

Award process
The ten sportspersons on the award shortlist was drawn up by a "panel of 30 sports editors from national and regional newspapers and magazines", and announced on 29 November 2010. As a preview to the awards, the nominees were interviewed for Sports Personality of the Year: The Contenders, a special edition of BBC One's Inside Sport, presented by Gabby Logan and broadcast on 13 December 2010. The award ceremony was held on Sunday 19 December at the LG Arena in Birmingham, and was broadcast live on BBC One, presented by Sue Barker, Gary Lineker and Jake Humphrey. The winner was decided by a public telephone vote during the ceremony.

Nominees
The nominees and their achievements in 2010 as described by the BBC, and their share of the votes cast were as follows:

Winner
The winner was announced as  jockey Tony McCoy. 15 time world champion darts player Phil "The Power" Taylor was runner up, with world and European heptathlon champion Jessica Ennis voted third.

Other awards
As part of the 2010 ceremony, awards were also to be presented for:

 Team of the Year: Ryder Cup team 
 Coach of the Year: Colin Montgomerie 
 Overseas Personality: Rafael Nadal 
 Young Personality: Tom Daley 
 Helen Rollason Award: Frank Williams 
 Unsung Hero Award:  Lance Haggith (Basketball) 
 Lifetime Achievement: David Beckham

In Memoriam

Andy Holmes
Andy Ripley
Terry Newton
Bobby Smith
Dick Francis
Malcolm Allison
Alec Bedser
Gil Merrick
Shoya Tomizawa
Tom Walkinshaw
Nodar Kumaritashvili
Laurent Fignon
Greville Starkey
Ronnie Clayton
Garry Purdham
Alex Higgins
Paddy Mullins
Keith Alexander
Ralph Coates
Dale Roberts
Adam Stansfield
Juan Antonio Samaranch
Wilf Paish
Harry Carpenter
Bill McLaren

References

External links
Official website

Bbc Sports Personality Of The Year Award, 2010
Bbc Sports Personality Of The Year Award, 2010
BBC Sports Personality of the Year awards
2010 in British sport
Bbc